The Lethbridge City Council is the legislative governing body that represents the citizens of Lethbridge, Alberta. Eight councillors and the mayor comprise the council. The mayor is the city's chief elected official and the city manager is its chief administrative officer. For the 2017–2021 term, the mayor is Chris Spearman and the councillors are Mark Campbell, Jeff Carlson, Jeffrey Coffman, Belinda Crowson, Blaine Hyggen, Joseph Mauro, Rob Miyashiro, and Ryan Parker.

History

In 1890, when the local population reached 1,478, an application was made to the Legislative Assembly of the Northwest Territories to grant town incorporation. Such was granted on 3 December of that year and the following 9 February, the first town council meeting was held in the Lethbridge Hotel. Charles Alexander Magrath was the first mayor and was joined by six aldermen.

Shortly after Alberta became a province in 1905, an application was made for a city charter. City status was granted on 9 May 1906, and the first council meeting was held on 21 May with a mayor and six aldermen as before.

The Alberta Legislature approved a new charter on 25 March 1913 that would see the city governed by three elected commissioners: the mayor, who was also commissioner of finance; a commissioner of public utilities and a commissioner of public works. The charter became effective 1 January 1914 and the first meeting under this commission was held on 5 January 1914 under mayor William Duncan Livingston Hardie.

Within eight years, however, local citizens felt the commission was becoming dictatorial and were able to get the charter amended to allow for three additional but advisory commissioners. The newly elected commissioners attended their first meeting on 24 April 1922. 

In 1928, Lethbridgians voted in a plebiscite to change their civic government from commission board scheme to council–manager form. The council was to be composed of seven aldermen, one of whom would be elected internally as mayor. As well, a city manager was to be appointed by city council to administer its policies. The new elections were held in June 1928, with city councillors elected through Single transferable voting (STV). They were to serve staggered terms. In their first meeting, on 23 July 1928, council elected Robert Barrowman as mayor.

Disillusionment with STV led to a referendum being held in December 1928, where a majority voted in favour of cancelling STV.  

Thereafter the city has elected its city council through Block Voting, at-large with no wards. Block Voting means there are a far greater number of votes than the number of voters. In 2017, 21,000 voters cast 128,000 votes.

In 1961, city electors voted in favour of electing their mayor directly. In 1962, city voters elected Frank Sherring as mayor. Seven years later, the number of aldermen was increased from six to eight, the number it still has today.

Elections

Every four years, the City of Lethbridge holds municipal elections for the positions of councillor and mayor. All councillors are elected at large.

The tables below show all candidates who ran in recent elections, bold indicates elected, and incumbents are italicized.

2021 election

In the 2021 elections, to be held on October 18, 2021, voters will elect a mayor and 8 councillors.

2017 election

In the 2017 elections, the mayor was elected from 3 candidates, and 8 councillors from 28 candidates.

2013 election

In the 2013 elections, the mayor was elected from 4 candidates, and 8 councillors from 29 candidates.

2010 election

In the 2010 elections, the mayor was elected from 6 candidates, and 8 aldermen from 30 candidates. However, one alderman-elect died before being sworn in. The vacancy was filled in a 2011 by-election, by the 2010 runner-up, amongst ten candidates.

2007 election

In the 2007 elections, the incumbent mayor was acclaimed, and eight aldermen were elected from 16 candidates.

2004 election
The 2004 election was held October 18, 2004.

2001 election
The 2001 election was held October 15, 2001.

1998 election
The 1998 election was held October 26, 1998.

References

Dates in the History of the Government of Lethbridge, City of Lethbridge. Accessed 23 December 2006.

External links
City Council website

Municipal councils in Alberta
Politics of Lethbridge